Ivan Ivanovich Zhegalkin (3 August 1869, Mtsensk – 28 March 1947, Moscow) was a Russian and Soviet mathematician. He is best known for his formulation of Boolean algebra as the theory of the ring of integers mod 2, via what are now called Zhegalkin polynomials.

Zhegalkin was professor of mathematics at Moscow State University. He helped found the thriving mathematical logic group there, which became the Department of Mathematical Logic established by Sofya Yanovskaya in 1959. Reminiscing on his student days, Nikolai Luzin recalls Zhegalkin as the only professor he was not afraid of.

References

 
 
 
  (NB. German translation of булевы алгебры, 1969.)
 
  (NB. Circulation: 1000.)

External links
 http://letopis.msu.ru/peoples/923

1869 births
1947 deaths
19th-century mathematicians from the Russian Empire
20th-century Russian mathematicians
People from Mtsensk
Recipients of the Order of the Red Banner of Labour
Russian logicians
Russian mathematicians
Soviet logicians
Soviet mathematicians
Burials at Vagankovo Cemetery